Ballerina also known as The Copenhagen Ballet  is the story of a young girl Mette Sorensen (played by Mette Hønningen) who aspires to be a dancer with the Royal Danish Ballet, against the wishes of her mother but with the support of her musician father and her mentor, the famous ballerina Kirsten Holm (played by Kirsten Simone).

The story opens with Mette greeting Kirsten at the airport following the latter's return from a successful dance tour. They ride into the city together where Kirsten notices that Mette is slightly down-hearted about her own progress at ballet school. She soon gathers from the Ballet Master, and Madame Karova, Mette's teacher, that all is not well and Mette is not showing the promise she had originally displayed. The audience then learns that Mette's mother is against her pursuing a career as a ballerina, wanting her instead to settle down with her boyfriend Sven.

With Kirsten's backing, Mette secures a place at the Royal Danish ballet ('the company') and takes a small, solo part in Swan Lake, in which she excels. Kirsten is then asked to go to London at short notice, leaving the Ballet Master without a female lead soloist for Coppelia. Kirsten recommends Mette for the part. The remaining part of the film follows Mette's rehearsals and the various ups and downs on the path towards the finale of Coppelia and her arrival as the company's newest star. A young Jenny Agutter also stars as a pupil at the ballet school who turns to Mette for guidance and mentorship.

References

External links
 
 

1966 television films
1966 films
Films about ballet
1966 drama films